Moncton East was a provincial electoral district for the Legislative Assembly of New Brunswick, Canada. Prior to 2007, it has been held by only two individuals both of whom served as Premier of New Brunswick. Ray Frenette, a Liberal who served as premier from 1997 to 1998, represented the district from its creation for the 1974 election until he resigned in 1998. Bernard Lord, a Progressive Conservative who served as premier from 1999 to 2006, won the seat in a by-election after Frenette's resignation until his own resignation on January 31, 2007.  Its last MLA, Liberal Chris Collins, was elected in a by-election to replace Lord.

The district was abolished at the 2013 redistribution, however a new district by the same name was created out of a minority of its territory and population.

Members of the Legislative Assembly

Election results

Sources

External links 
Website of the Legislative Assembly of New Brunswick

Former provincial electoral districts of New Brunswick
Politics of Moncton